Marching Orders may refer to:

Marching Orders, New Zealand band on Flying Nun Records
"Marching Orders", song by Kosheen from Damage
"Marching Orders", song by Editors from In Dream
Marching Orders (TV series), a 2018 Netflix documentary series